János Tamás [] (24 May 1936 – 14 November 1995) was a Hungarian-Swiss composer, conductor and music educator.

Tamás studied in his home town Budapest. After the Hungarian Revolution of 1956, he fled to Switzerland in 1956 and completed his studies at the Bern and Zurich Conservatories. From 1961, he worked as Solorepetitor at the Zürich Opera House, and from 1963 as First Kapellmeister of the Städtebundtheater Biel-Solothurn. In 1969 he was granted citizenship of Schönenwerd. Tamás worked as a teacher at the Old Cantonal School Aarau from 1971.

Tamás died in Aarau at the age of 59.

Further reading 
 
 Michael Schneider: Der Komponist János Tamás. Ein Porträt anhand seiner Kompositionen für den Instrumentalunterricht. In Schweizer Musikpädagogische Blätter 2 (1990).
 Förderverein János Támas (ed.): Feuerbilder – Schattenklänge – János Tamás. Komponist, Dirigent, Pädagoge. Müller & Schade, Bern 1997, .

References

External links 
 
 

1936 births
1995 deaths
Musicians from Budapest
Hungarian male composers
20th-century Hungarian educators
20th-century Hungarian male musicians